Rénald LeClerc (born November 12, 1947) is a Canadian retired professional ice hockey player who played 87 games in the National Hockey League and 452 games in the World Hockey Association between 1968 and 1979. He played for the Detroit Red Wings, Quebec Nordiques and Indianapolis Racers. As a youth, he played in the 1960 Quebec International Pee-Wee Hockey Tournament with the junior Quebec Aces.

Career statistics

Regular season and playoffs

References

External links
 

1947 births
Living people
Canadian ice hockey centres
Cleveland Barons (1937–1973) players
Detroit Red Wings draft picks
Detroit Red Wings players
Fort Worth Wings players
Hamilton Red Wings (OHA) players
Ice hockey people from Quebec City
Indianapolis Racers players
Quebec Nordiques (WHA) players
San Diego Gulls (WHL) players
Tidewater Wings players